Mavis Gwendolyn Gilmour-Petersen, OJ, CD (born April 13, 1926) is a Jamaican medical practitioner and politician, representing the Jamaica Labour Party (JLP). She served as minister of education from 1980 to 1986.

Early life and education
Gilmour-Petersen was born on April 13, 1926 in St Elizabeth. She is the daughter of Isaac and Adelaide Holness. Gilmour-Petersen attended Blake's Tutorial College; Howard University in Washington DC, and the University of Edinburgh, Scotland.

Medical career

Gilmour-Petersen graduated from Howard University College of Medicine in 1951. She then served at a number of hospitals in Jamaica and the Cayman Islands. In 1959 she embarked on her Fellowship of the Royal College of Surgeons in Edinburgh. Upon completion, she was appointed Consultant Surgeon at the Kingston Public Hospital (KPH) and  become the first woman surgeon in the Caribbean, serving the KPH from 1960 to 1976.

Political career
Gilmour-Petersen entered elective politics in 1976 and won the St. Andrew West Rural constituency which she held until 1989.  As a member of Edward Seaga's Cabinet, she served as minister of education from 1980 to 1986 when she was replaced by Neville Gallimore. She then served as minister of social security and consumer affairs from 1986 to 1989.

Honours and awards
 Gilmour-Petersen was awarded the Order of Distinction, Commander Class in  2004.
 She was awarded Jamaica’s fourth-highest honour, the Order of Jamaica, in 2009.

See also
 List of Education Ministers of Jamaica
 Women in the House of Representatives of Jamaica
 List of female Members of the House of Representatives of Jamaica

References

1931 births
People from Saint Elizabeth Parish
Commanders of the Order of Distinction
Government ministers of Jamaica
Education Ministers of Jamaica
Women government ministers of Jamaica
Jamaica Labour Party politicians
Members of the House of Representatives of Jamaica
Howard University alumni
Alumni of the University of Edinburgh
Living people
20th-century Jamaican women politicians
20th-century Jamaican politicians